Petőfi may refer to:
 Sándor Petőfi (1823–1849), a Hungarian poet and revolutionary
 Petőfi Bridge
 Petőfi Csarnok ("Petőfi Hall")
 Dem Andenken Petőfis ("In Petofi's Memory"), a piece for piano by Ferenc Liszt
 Petőfi '73, a 1973 Hungarian drama film directed by Ferenc Kardos
 4483 Petöfi, a main belt asteroid
 National Peasant Party (Hungary), a short-lived 1956 revival of a Hungarian political party under the name Petőfi Party
 Count Petofi, a fictional character in the TV drama Dark Shadows

Hungarian-language surnames
hu:Petőfi